Joel Sclavi (born 25 June 1994) is an Argentine rugby union player who plays for Stade Rochelais in French top 14. On 21 November 2019, he was named in the Jaguares squad for the 2020 Super Rugby season.

Honours

Club 
 La Rochelle
European Rugby Champions Cup: 2021–2022

References

External links
 

Jaguares (Super Rugby) players
Rugby union props
Argentine rugby union players
1994 births
Living people
Section Paloise players
SU Agen Lot-et-Garonne players
Stade Rochelais players